Robert Gerald Beaumont (April 1, 1932 – October 24, 2011) was the founder of Sebring-Vanguard a Florida-based company that produced the Citicar, an electric automobile manufacturer from 1974 to 1977. He was born in Teaneck, New Jersey and attended Hartwick College after serving in the United States Air Force.

Career 
Beaumont was the owner of a Chrysler dealership in upstate New York. In the early 70's, he moved to Sebring, Florida, where he founded Vanguard Vehicles, later named Sebring Vanguard where the CitiCar was produced. Nearly 2,300 Citicars were built and sold, many of which are still in use today. Sebring-Vanguard closed in 1977 with most of the assets sold to Frank Flower who formed a new company called Commuter Vehicles, Inc. to continue production of his re engineered Commuter-Car version from 1979 to 1982.
After the closing of Sebring-Vanguard, Beaumont moved to the Washington D.C area in order to lobby and promote electric vehicles.  Later he established a used automobile dealership outside Columbia, Maryland.
In the early 1990s with the California emissions regulations looming, Beaumont formed Renaissance Cars, Inc. and created the all-electric Tropica.

Death 
Beaumont died October 24, 2011, at his home in Columbia, Maryland.

References

Sources 
 Robert G. Beaumont Designer of the Citicar
 The Lost Cord by Barbara Taylor Published 1995.   

1932 births
2011 deaths
American founders of automobile manufacturers
Hartwick College alumni
People from Columbia, Maryland
People from Teaneck, New Jersey